The following is a list of wax figures which are currently displayed or have been displayed at one of the Madame Tussauds museums.

List

A

 Aaliyah
 Abraham Lincoln
 Adile Naşit
 Adolf Hitler
 
 Afrojack
 Agnez Mo
 Aishwarya Rai Bachchan
 Al Roker
 Alan Carr
 Alan Jackson
 Albert Einstein
 Alessandra Ambrosio
 Alexander Ovechkin
 Aleyna Tilki
 Alfie Deyes
 Alfred Hitchcock
 Alicia Keys
 Alien from Alien: Covenant
 Alvin and the Chipmunks
 Amelia Earhart
 Amitabh Bachchan
 Amy Winehouse
 André Hazes
 
 Anil Kapoor
 Anita Mui
 Anthony Joshua
 Antony Armstrong-Jones
 Anushka Sharma
 Adele
 Adriana Lima
 Anderson Cooper
 Andreas Gabalier
 Prince Andrew
 Anduin Lothar (Warcraft character)
 Andy Warhol
 Anitta
 Amna Al Haddad
 Anna Wintour
 Anne Frank
 Anne Hathaway
 Annabelle
 Angela Bassett
 Angela Merkel
 Angelababy
 Angelina Jolie
 Anggun Cipta Sasmi
 Ant & Dec
 Anthony Joshua
 A. P. J. Abdul Kalam
 Aquaman (DC character)
 Arda Turan
 Ariana Grande
 Armin van Buuren
 Arnold Schwarzenegger as the Terminator
 Astro Boy
 Asha Bhosle
 Audrey Hepburn
 Austin Mahone
 Avicii
 Ayrton Senna

B

 BB-8 (Star Wars character)
 Babe Ruth
 Bae Suzy
 Bad Bunny
 Balqees Ahmed Fathi
 Barbara Walters
 Barack Obama
 Barış Manço
 Batman (DC character)
 Beatrice Egli
 Benazir Bhutto
 Benjamin Franklin
 Benedict Cumberbatch
 Beren Saat
 Bet Lynch (Coronation Street character)
 Bette Davis
 Betty White
 Beyoncé
 Bianca Heinicke
 Bill Clinton
 Bill Gates
 Bill Kaulitz
 Billy Porter
 Billie Holiday
 Billie Jean King
 Bin Baz
 Black Panther (Marvel character)
 Blue Man Group
 Bob Dylan
 Bob Hope
 Bob Marley
 Boris Johnson
 Boris Karloff
 Brad Pitt
 Bradley Cooper
 Britney Spears
 Brian Cox
 Brian Lara
 Bruce Forsyth
 Bruce Lee
 Bruce Springsteen
 Bruce Willis
 Bruno Mars
 Buzz Aldrin

C

 C-3PO (Star Wars character)
 Çağatay Ulusoy as Harun
 Cai Xukun
 Calvin Harris
 Cameron Diaz
 Camilla, Duchess of Cornwall
 Capital Bra
 Captain America (Marvel character)
 Captain Marvel (Marvel character)
 Cara Delevingne
 Carl Perkins
 Carrie Fisher as Princess Leia (Star Wars character)
 Carrie Underwood
 Carmelo Anthony
 Cate Blanchett
 Catherine, Duchess of Cambridge
 Cathy Freeman
 Catriona Gray
 Cecilia Cheung
 Celine Dion
 Channing Tatum
 Chantal Janzen
 King Charles III
 Charles Esten
 Charles Dickens
 Charlie Chaplin
 Charlize Theron
 Chester A. Arthur
 Cheryl
 Chewbacca (Star Wars character)
 Christian Bale
 Chuck Liddell
 Clark Gable
 Clint Eastwood
 Cody Simpson
 Conchita Wurst
 Colin Firth
 Colin Powell
 Conan O'Brien
 Conor McGregor
 Connie Britton as Rayna Jaymes
 Courtney Act
 Christina Aguilera
 Criss Angel
 Cristiano Ronaldo
 Cro
 Curtis Stone
 Cyborg (DC character)

D

 Dalai Lama
 Dale Earnhardt
 Dale Earnhardt Jr.
 Dame Edna Everage
 Dan Marino
 Daniel Craig as James Bond
 Daniel Radcliffe
 Dannii Minogue
 Danny Trejo
 DanTDM
 Darius Rucker
 Darth Maul (Star Wars character)
 Darth Vader (Star Wars character)
 David Alaba
 David Attenborough
 David Beckham
 David Bowie
 David Cameron
 David Hasselhoff
 David Wright
 David Jason
 Davina McCall
 Davina Michelle
 Deepika Padukone
 Delta Goodrem
 Demi Lovato
 Dennis Nilsen
 Denzel Washington
 Derek Jeter
 Desmond Tutu
 Diana, Princess of Wales
 Diana Ross
 Diljit Dosanjh
 Dirk Nowitzki
 Don Bradman
 Don King
 Donald Trump
 Dominic Thiem
 Donnie Yen
 Dorothy Parker
 Drake
 Dua Lipa
 Durotan (Warcraft character)
 Dylan Alcott
 Dwayne Johnson

E

 E.T.
 Ed Sheeran
 Eddie Mabo
 Eddie Murphy
 Eddie Redmayne
 Edward III
 Edward Scissorhands
 Edwin Lee
 Edis
 Eli Manning
 Elie Saab
 Ella Fitzgerald
 Elle Macpherson
 Queen Elizabeth I
 Queen Elizabeth II
 Elton John
 Elvis Presley
 Enzo Knol
 Emma Watson
 Emmeline Pankhurst
 Eric Church
 Erich Honecker
 Ernest Hemingway
 Eva Longoria
 Evander Holyfield

F

 F. Scott Fitzgerald
 Faith Hill
 Fan Bingbing
 Fergie
 Fidel Castro
 Princess Fiona
 The Flash (DC character)
 Frank Bruno
 Frank Sinatra
 Franklin D. Roosevelt
 Franklin Pierce
 Freddie Mercury
 Frederick Douglass
 Frida Kahlo
 Friedensreich Hundertwasser

G

 Garona Halforcen (Warcraft character)
 Gary Barlow
 G.E.M.
 King George III
 Prince George
 George Clooney
 George Harrison
 George H. W. Bush
 George Jones
 George Lazenby as James Bond
 George Lopez
 George Steinbrenner
 George Strait
 George W. Bush
 George Washington
 Gérard Depardieu
 Gerhard Berger
 The Gingerbread Man (Shrek character)
 Glenn McGrath
 Gok Wan
 Gong Jun
 Gordon Ramsay
 Gottfried Helnwein
 Greg Inglis
 Groot (Marvel character)
 Grover Cleveland
 Grumpy Cat
 Gurmit Singh as Phua Chu Kang
 Gustav Klimt
 Guy Fawkes
 Guy Pearce
 Gwen Stefani

H

 Halle Berry
 Hansi Hinterseer
 Hank Williams
 Hardwell
 Harry Styles
 Harrison Ford as Han Solo
 Harriet Tubman
 Prince Harry
 Harry S. Truman
 Harvey Milk
 Hawkeye (Marvel character)
 Hawley Harvey Crippen
 Hayden Christensen as Anakin Skywalker
 Heath Ledger
 Heidi Klum
 Helen Keller
 Helen Mirren
 Helene Fischer
 Hello Kitty
 Henry VIII
 Henry Ford
 Henry Lawson
 Henry Parkes
 Herbert Hoover
 Herbert Prohaska
 Herman Brood
 Hermann Maier
 Hilda Ogden
 Hillary Clinton
 Howard Hughes
 Hrithik Roshan
 Hu Jintao
 Huda Kattan
 Hugh Bonneville
 Hugh Grant
 Hugh Hefner
 Humphrey Bogart
 Hulkbuster (Marvel character)
 The Incredible Hulk (Marvel character)
 Hyun Bin

I

 Ian Smith as Harold Bishop
 Ian Thorpe
 Indira Gandhi
 Isaac Newton
 The Invisible Woman (Marvel character)
 Iron Man (Marvel character)

J

 J. Edgar Hoover
 Jabba the Hutt (Star Wars character)
 Jack Duckworth (Coronation Street character)
 Jack Nicholson
 Jack P. Shepherd
 Jack the Ripper
 Jackie Chan
 Jacob Elordi
 Jackson Wang
 Jacques Chirac
 Jacqueline Kennedy Onassis
 Jade Thirlwall
 Jamie Foxx
 Jamie Oliver
 James Brown
 James Cook
 James Dean
 Jane Horrocks
 Jane Lynch as Sue Sylvester
 Janis Joplin
 Jason Aldean
 Jason Derulo
 Jay Chou
 Jean-Paul Marat
 Jeff Gordon
 Jenna Marbles
 Jennifer Aniston
 Jennifer Hudson
 Jennifer Lopez
 Jeremy Lin
 Jerry Garcia
 Jerry Lee Lewis
 Jerry Springer
 Jesse Owens
 Jessica Ennis-Hill
 Jessica Simpson
 Jesy Nelson
 Jet Li
 Jiang Zemin
 Jim Carrey
 Jim Parsons
 Jimmy Barnes
 Jimmy Carter
 Jimmy Dickens
 Jimmy Fallon
 Jimmy Kimmel
 Jimi Hendrix
 Joan Rivers
 Joanna Lumley
 Joachim Gauck
 Jodie Whittaker as Doctor Who
 Joe Biden
 Joe Hart
 Joe Montana
 Johan Cruijff
 John Adams
 John Bishop
 John Boyega
 John Christie
 John F. Kennedy
 John Haigh
 John Howard
 John Quincy Adams
 John Travolta
 Johnny Cash
 Johnny Depp
 John Lennon
 John Wayne
 Joko Widodo
 Jon Hamm
 Jonah Lomu
 Jonas Brothers
 Josephine Baker
 José Mourinho
 Juan Ponce de León
 Judy Garland as Dorothy Gale
 Julia Gillard
 Julia Roberts
 Juliette Gordon Low
 Junichiro Koizumi
 Justin Bieber
 Justin Timberlake

K

 Kajal Aggarwal
 Kajol
 Kamala Harris
 Kanye West
 Kapil Dev
 Karan Johar
 Kareena Kapoor
 Karl Marx
 Kate McKinnon as Jillian Holtzmann
 Kate Middleton
 Kate Moss
 Kate Winslet
 Katniss Everdeen (The Hunger Games character)
 Katie Couric
 Katy Perry
 Kathy Griffin
 Katrina Kaif
 Kazuyoshi Miura
 Keith Lemon
 Keith Urban
 Ken Barlow (Coronation Street character)
 Ken Dodd
 Kendall Jenner
 Kenny Rogers
 Kid Rock
 Kim Kardashian
 Kim Soo-Hyun
 Kim Woo-bin
 Kim Hyun Joong
 King Kong
 Kıvanç Tatlıtuğ
 Kobe Bryant
 Kray twins
 KSI
 Kung Fu Panda
 Kwa Geok Choo
 Kylie Minogue
 Kylie Jenner

L

 Lance Armstrong
 Lady Gaga
 Larry King
 Laverne Cox
 Lay Zhang
 Lee Chong Wei
 Lee Hsien Loong
 Lee Jong-suk
 Lee Kuan Yew
 Lee Min-ho
 Leigh-Anne Pinnock
 Lenny Kravitz
 Leona Lewis
 Leonard Bernstein
 Leonardo da Vinci
 Leonardo DiCaprio
 Lewis Capaldi
 Lewis Hamilton
 Li Na
 Lil Nas X
 Lil Kleine
 Liam Hemsworth
 Liam Neeson as Qui-Gon Jinn
 Liam Payne
 Lin Dan
 Lionel Messi
 Liz Smith
 Liza Minnelli
 Lizzo
 Loki (Marvel character)
 Lorde
 Loretta Lynn
 Louis XVI
 Louis Armstrong
 Louis Koo
 Louis Tomlinson
 Louis Walsh
 Lu Han
 Luciano Pavarotti
 Ludwig van Beethoven
 Luke Bryan
 Luo Tianyi (Vocaloid)
 Lyndon B. Johnson

M

 Madhubala as Anarkali
 Madhuri Dixit
 Madonna
 Mahesh Babu
 Mahatma Gandhi
 Makarios III
 Malcolm X
 Maluma
 Manuel Neuer
 Mao Zedong
 Masaki Suda
 Marco Borsato
 Maria Sharapova
 Marlene Dietrich
 Marlon Brando
 Marilyn Monroe
 Marie Antoinette
 Marie Tussaud 
 Mario Maurer
 Mary Kom
 Mary MacKillop
 Mark Webber
 Mark Zuckerberg
 Martin Luther King Jr.
 Master Chief (Halo character)
 Matt Lauer
 Matt Lucas as Andy Pipkin
 Matthias Schweighofer
 Maya Diab
 Maximilien de Robespierre
 Mayu Watanabe
 McDull
 Megan Gale
 Meghan, Duchess of Sussex
 Mehmed the Conqueror
 Melania Trump
 Melissa McCarthy as Abby Yates
 Mesut Özil
 Michael Phelps
 Michael Jackson
 Michael Jordan
 Michael Strahan
 Michelle Connor (Coronation Street character)
 Michelle Obama
 Michelle Yeoh
 Mike Tyson
 Mikhail Gorbachev
 Miley Cyrus
 Mimar Sinan
 Minnie Pearl
 Missy Elliott
 Mitsu Dan
 Mo Farah
 Mohamed Salah
 Mohammed Assaf
 Mona Kattan
 Mona Lisa
 Morecambe and Wise
 Morgan Freeman
 Motu Patlu
 Muhammad Ali
 Murat Boz
 Mustafa Kemal Atatürk
 Müslüm Gürses

N

 Nancy Ajram
 Nancy Reagan
 Naomi Campbell
 Niall Horan
 Napoleon Bonaparte
 Narendra Modi
 Neil Armstrong
 Neil Patrick Harris
 Nelson Mandela
 Neville Heath
 Neymar
 Ned Kelly
 Nick Fury (Marvel character)
 Nichkhun
 Nicki Minaj
 Nicolas Cage
 Nicolas Sarkozy
 Nicole Kidman
 Nikkie de Jager
 The Notorious B.I.G.

O

 Obi-Wan Kenobi (Star Wars character)
 Olaf Scholz
 Olivia Newton-John
 Olly Murs
 Oprah Winfrey
 Orlando Bloom as Will Turner
 Oscar Wilde
 Otto von Bismarck
 Otto Waalkes
 Ozzy Osbourne

P

 Pablo Picasso
 Paddy McGuinness
 Paris Hilton
 Park Hae-jin
 Patrick Stewart
 Patrick Swayze
 Patsy Cline
 Paul McCartney
 Paul Newman
 Perrie Edwards
 Penélope Cruz
 Peng Liyuan,
 Pennywise
 Peter Andre
 Peter Dinklage
 Peter Alexander
 Peyton Manning
 Pia Wurtzbach
 Pitbull
 Pharrell Williams
 Phil Taylor
 Prince Philip
 Pierce Brosnan as James Bond
 Pink
 Pope Benedict XVI
 Pope Francis
 Pope John Paul II
 Prabhas as Baahubali
 Prince
 Prince William, Duke of Cambridge
 Priyanka Chopra

Q
 Quentin Crisp
 Quentin Tarantino

R

 R2-D2 (Star Wars character)
 Ranbir Kapoor
 Randy Travis
 Rafael Nadal
 Ray Meagher
 Reba McEntire
 Rebel Wilson
 Regan MacNeil
 Rey (Star Wars character)
 Ricky Martin
 Richard I
 Richard Nixon
 Rihanna
 Ringo Starr
 Robert Baden-Powell
 Robert Downey Jr. as Sherlock Holmes
 Robert Mugabe
 Robert Pattinson
 Robert Redford
 Robbie Williams
 Robin Williams
 Rocket Raccoon (Marvel character) 
 Roger Moore as James Bond
 Romeo Santos
 Ronald Reagan
 Ronaldinho
 Ronaldo
 Rosa Parks
 Ross Lynch
 RuPaul
 Rutherford B. Hayes
 Ruth Ellis
 Ryan Gosling
 Ryan Reynolds

S

 Sabiha Gökçen
 Sachin Tendulkar
 Saddam Hussein
 Sally Pearson
 Salma Hayek
 Salman Khan
 Salvador Dalí
 Samuel L. Jackson
 Sam Smith
 Sandra Bullock
 Santa Claus
 Sarah, Duchess of York
 Sarah Michelle Gellar
 Sathyaraj
 Scarlett Johansson
 Sean Combs
 Sean Connery as James Bond
 Sebastian Vettel
 Selena Gomez
 Selena Quintanilla
 Serena Williams
 Shah Rukh Khan
 Shahid Kapoor
 Shakira
 Shane Warne
 Shaquille O'Neal
 Sharon Osbourne
 Shawn Mendes
 Shrek
 Shreya Ghoshal
 Sigmund Freud
 Simon Cowell
 Sleeping Beauty
 Slimer
 Sofía Vergara
 Smosh
 Snoop Dogg
 Sonja Zietlow
 Sonu Nigam
 Sooty and Sweep
 Spider-Man (Marvel character) 
 SpongeBob SquarePants
 Sridevi
 Stan Lee
 Stefanie Sun
 Stephen Colbert
 Stephen Curry
 Stephen Hawking
 Steve Irwin
 Steve Jobs
 Steve Aoki
 Stevie Wonder
 Steven Gerrard
 Steven Spielberg
 Stormzy
 Sukarno
 Sunny Leone
 Superman (DC character)
 Susan Boyle
 Susan Sarandon
 Suzy Bae

T

 Tammy Wynette
 Tansu Çiller
 Tarık Akan
 Taylor Lautner
 Taylor Swift
 Teresa Teng
 Teddy Teclebrhan
 Thor (Marvel character)
 Thomas Edison
 Thomas Jefferson
 Theodore Roosevelt
 Theresa May
 The Nun
 Tiësto
 Tiffany Haddish
 Tiger Woods
 Tim Cahill
 Tim McGraw
 Timothy Dalton as James Bond
 Tinker Bell
 Tolga Çevik
 Tom Baker as the Doctor
 Tom Cruise
 Tom Daley
 Tom Hanks
 Tom Hiddleston as James Conrad
 Tom Hardy
 Tommy Cooper
 Toni Collette
 Tony Bennett
 Tony Blair
 Tony Hawk
 Tony Jaa
 Trisha Yearwood
 Troye Sivan
 Tuba Büyüküstün
 Tupac Shakur
 Tyra Banks

U
 Udo Jürgens
 Uma Thurman
 Uncle Sam
 Usain Bolt
 Usher

V

 Varun Dhawan
 Vera Duckworth
 Virat Kohli
 Vladimir Putin
 Queen Victoria
 Victoria Beckham
 Vin Diesel
 Vincent van Gogh
 Voltaire
 Virgil Van Dijk

W

 Walt Disney
 Waylon Jennings
 Wayne Gretzky
 Wayne Newton
 Wayne Rooney
 Wendy Williams
 Whitney Houston
 Whoopi Goldberg
 Will.i.am
 Prince William
 William Henry Harrison
 William Howard Taft
 William McKinley
 William Shakespeare
 Will Smith
 King Willem-Alexander
 Wincent Weiss
 Winston Churchill
 Wolfgang Amadeus Mozart
 Logan / Wolverine (Marvel character)
 Wonder Woman (DC character)
 Woody Allen
 Woodrow Wilson

X
 X Japan
 Xi Jinping

Y

 Yao Ming
 Yasser Arafat
 Yaşar Kemal
 Yayoi Kusama
 Yoda (Star Wars character)
 Yuko Oshima
 Yuzuru Hanyu

Z

 Zac Efron
 Zach Galifianakis as Alan Garner
 Zachary Taylor
 Zayn Malik
 Zendaya
 Zeki Müren
 Zhu Yilong
 Zoe Saldana
 Zoe Wees

See also 
 Marie Tussaud
 Madame Tussauds Amsterdam
 Madame Tussauds Beijing
 Madame Tussauds Blackpool
 Madame Tussauds Delhi
 Madame Tussauds Hollywood
 Madame Tussauds Hong Kong
 Madame Tussauds Las Vegas
 Madame Tussauds New York
 Madame Tussauds San Francisco
 Madame Tussauds Shanghai
 Madame Tussauds Singapore
 Madame Tussauds Sydney
 Madame Tussauds Vienna
 Madame Tussauds Washington D.C.

Notes

References

Madame Tussauds
wax figures